In algebra, a Lie-admissible algebra, introduced by ,  is a (possibly non-associative) algebra that becomes a Lie algebra under the bracket [a, b] = ab − ba. Examples include associative algebras, Lie algebras, and Okubo algebras.

See also

Malcev-admissible algebra
Jordan-admissible algebra

References

 

Non-associative algebra